Journal of Child Sexual Abuse is an interdisciplinary, peer-reviewed, scholarly journal that provides an interface for researchers, academicians, attorneys, clinicians, and practitioners. The journal advocates for increased networking in the sexual abuse field, greater dissemination of information and research, a greater acknowledgment of child sexual abuse, and development of effective assessment, intervention, and prevention programs.
The Editor-in-Chief is Robert Geffner.

References 

Sexology journals
Publications established in 1992
Taylor & Francis academic journals
Bimonthly journals